Sibiciu may refer to one of two places in Buzău County, Romania:

 Sibiciu de Jos, a village in Pănătău Commune
 Sibiciu de Sus, a village in Pătârlagele town

Rivers
 Sibiciu River